Jana Schmidt (born 13 December 1972) is a Paralympian athlete from Germany competing mainly in category T42 track and field events.

Athletics career
Schmidt first represented Germany at a Summer Paralympics in 2008 at Beijing, where she competed in the javelin throw and shot put. It would take her another four years to achieve a Paralympic podium finish, when she won a bronze medal in 100 metres sprint at the 2012 Summer Paralympics in London. As well as her Paralympic success, Schmidt has won medals at World and European Championships. At the World Championships she has performed the uncommon feat of medaling in a running, jumping and throwing event, with her best finish being the gold medal in the shot put at the 2013 World Championships in Lyon.

Notes

External links
 
 
 

1972 births
Living people
German female sprinters
German female long jumpers
German female shot putters
German female javelin throwers
Paralympic athletes of Germany
Paralympic bronze medalists for Germany
Paralympic medalists in athletics (track and field)
Athletes (track and field) at the 2008 Summer Paralympics
Athletes (track and field) at the 2012 Summer Paralympics
Medalists at the 2012 Summer Paralympics
People from Teterow
People from Bezirk Neubrandenburg
Sportspeople from Mecklenburg-Western Pomerania
20th-century German women